Sul ponte dei sospiri is a 1953 Italian adventure film.

Cast
 Frank Latimore as Captain Vessillo
 Maria Frau as Bianca Spada
 Massimo Girotti as Marco Spada 
 Françoise Rosay as Dama di Sant'Agata
 Eduardo Ciannelli as Inquisitore  
 Luciana Vedovelli as Nerissa Fornier
 Carlo Micheluzzi as Il Doge
 Gisella Sofio as Barberina
 Lauro Gazzolo as Il banchiere

See also
 The Avenger of Venice (1964)

External links
 

1950s Italian-language films
Italian adventure drama films
1953 adventure films
1953 films
Films set in Venice
Films about bridges
Italian black-and-white films
1953 drama films
1950s Italian films